Moșana is a commune in Dondușeni District, Moldova. It is composed of two villages, Moșana and Octeabriscoe.

References

Communes of Dondușeni District